Bodwell may refer to:

 Bodwell Water Power Company Plant
 Bodwell High School
 Bodwell (surname)